Love My Scent is a 2023 South Korean romantic comedy film written and directed by Lim Sung-yong. Starring Yoon Shi-yoon and Seol In-ah, the film depicts the romance of a man who does not like work or dating, and a woman, who has everything but a relationship. A magical romance begins when a scent of a perfume made them fall in love. It was released theatrically in South Korea on February 8, 2023.

Cast
 Yoon Shi-yoon as Chang-soo
 Seol In-ah as A-ra
 Noh Sang-hyun as James
 Kim Young-woong as Na Jeom-jang
 Kim Soo-mi

Production
Yoon Shi-yoon and Seol In-ah were cast in the film in September 2021. They are working together for the first time under director Lim Seong-yong.

Principal photography began in September 2021.

Release and reception
The film was released theatrically on 173 screens on February 8, 2023.

, with gross of US$88,296 and 12,252 admissions, it is at the 16th place among Korean films released in 2023.

References

External links
 
 
 

2023 films
2023 romantic comedy films
2020s South Korean films
2020s Korean-language films
Lotte Entertainment films
South Korean romantic comedy films